Zongo Comics was founded and published in 1995 by Simpsons and Futurama creator Matt Groening. Unlike its counterpart Bongo Comics, the comics published were geared towards older audiences containing adult material and did not include any adaptations of Groening's cartoons. The only two titles in the Zongo Comics range were Jimbo and Fleener.

Zongo Comics did not last as long as its sister group, and the range was cancelled after the series failed to attract a wide audience. Because the Zongo Jimbos were not very popular when they came out, Zongo/Bongo printed less of each issue. By issue 6, they only printed 500.

Because only ten Zongo Comics were ever published, they are well sought after by collectors due to their rarity.

Publishing list

Jimbo

(7 issues) created & written by Gary Panter
Gary Panter's graphic novel Jimbo in Purgatory is thought of as #8 in this series but it was not published by Zongo.

The Museum of Contemporary Art, Los Angeles (MOCA) displayed Gary Panter's work, including his Jimbo series as part of the Masters of American Comics exhibition. The exhibition was held from November 20, 2005, through March 12, 2006. The Masters of American Comics explored the rise of newspaper comic strips and comic books while considering their artistic development throughout the century.

Postcards of the covers of Gary Panter's Jimbo comics were available in the MOCA gift shop.

During the 1995 San Diego Comic-Con the Bongo Comics booth gave out three Zongo Comic 1-1/2 promo buttons.
 Zongo Comics Logo
 Jimbo – Red
 Jimbo – Yellow

Fleener
(3 issues) created & written by Mary Fleener

External links
 Gary Panter's official website
 Mary Fleener's official website

Comic book publishing companies of the United States
Works by Matt Groening
Publishing companies established in 1995
Publishing companies disestablished in 1995